Kate Grace (born October 24, 1988) is an American middle distance runner. A multiple All-American runner for Yale University, she turned professional in 2011. Grace competed for the United States at the 2016 Summer Olympics, making it to the final of the 800 metres.

Prep
Grace was a multiple-league champion in high school for Marlborough School in Los Angeles. She won 2005, 2006 and 2007 CIF Southern Section Division IV 800 metres titles and placed 3rd at 800 meters in the CIF State Track and Field Championships in 2006. She set a high school personal best of 2:10.31 at Cerritos College in 2006.

As a senior, Grace won the 2006 CIF Southern Section Division IV Cross country running title, qualified to California Interscholastic Federation State Cross country running Championships, Grace led Marlborough to a team CIF State Cross country running Championship title, won CIF state cross country division four championships title in 18:24.

College
Attending Yale University, Grace broke four school records, won six Heps championships (one as a member of a relay team), and was a four-time NCAA Division I Track and Field and Cross country All-American. She graduated from Yale in 2011 with a degree in environmental studies.

NCAA championships

Outdoor track and field

Indoor track and field

Professional
Grace joined the New Jersey-New York Track Club in 2011, training under legendary coach Frank “Gags” Gagliano.

In 2012, Grace signed with Oiselle, a running apparel company based out of Seattle. Grace was the first runner that Oiselle signed, preceding an eventual full roster of professional runners, including Kara Goucher and Lauren Fleshman. Grace competed in the 800 and 1,500 meters at the 2012 Olympic Trials, but placed 20th in the 1500 and did not qualify for the final.

While working with Gagliano, Grace continued to improve her times on the track and won the 2013 USA road mile championship — her first national title. Grace won the 2013 USA 1 Mile Road Championship Grand Blue Mile. She placed 4th in the 800 meters at the 2013 USA Outdoor Track and Field Championships.

Grace placed 11th in the 1500 meters in the 2014 USA Outdoor Track and Field Championships in Sacramento, California. Grace was part of Team USA setting an American and North American record at the 2014 IAAF World Relays – Women's 4 × 1500 metres relay in 16:55.33. In 2014, Grace left New Jersey and Gagliano for Bend, Oregon where she began to train with Lauren Fleshman.

In 2015, Grace battled foot injuries that took her out of the racing season. She moved to Sacramento, California in July 2015 to join the NorCal Distance Project.

Grace ran 4:06.75 in the 1500 meters at the 2016 New Balance Indoor Grand Prix - a time qualifier for Athletics at the 2016 Summer Olympics. Grace was second in the New York Armory Women's Mile Elite - New Balance Games 2016 after leading teammate Kim Conley for 1500 meters.

Grace placed 5th in 4:22.7 at the 2016 Fifth Avenue Mile. Grace improved her personal best to 1:58.28 at Weltklasse Zürich of 2016 IAAF Diamond League in a fifth-place finish.

Grace placed first in the 800 m at the 2016 United States Olympic Track and Field Trials, making her first Olympic team. She competed for the US in Rio, where she set a personal best of 1:58.79 in the semifinal. Grace ultimately placed eighth in the 800 metres final.

In January 2017, Grace moved to Nike as a sponsored athlete. She wore the Nike kit for the first time in competition during the University of Washington Invitational. Grace ran a personal best 4:22.93 mile on February 11, 2017 at the Millrose Games. Grace placed second in 1000 meters in 2:36.97 at 2017 Indoor muller Grand Prix at Birmingham behind Laura Muir. Grace won the 800 meters in 2:01.25 at the 2017 Portland Twilight. Grace placed third in 1500 meters in 4:16.62 at 2017 Drake Relays behind Jennifer Simpson and Brenda Martinez. Grace placed 7th in the 1500 meters in 4:03.59 in Eugene at 2017 Prefontaine Classic on May 27. Grace placed second in a time of 4:06.95 in the 1500 meters final at 2017 USA Outdoor Track and Field Championships. Grace placed 23rd in the 1500 semifinal in a time of 4:16.70 of the 2017 World Championships.

In September 2017, Grace joined Coach Jerry Schumacher and the Bowerman Track Club.

In February 2018, Grace placed second behind teammate Colleen Quigley in the Wanamaker Mile at Millrose Games. In August 2018, Grace set a championship record in winning the 2018 NACAC Championships 1500 m in 4:06.23 at the Varsity Stadium, Toronto.

In July 2019, Grace won The Match Europe v USA 1500 m in 4:02.49. Grace scored nine points to help Team USA win in Minsk at Dinamo National Olympic Stadium.

Grace competed at the 2021 US Olympic Trials, but did not qualify for the 2020 Summer Olympics in Tokyo. She won the 800m Wanda Diamond League in Oslo and also the Millicent Fawcett Mile in Gateshead.

Personal
Grace is the daughter of fitness instructor and entrepreneur Kathy Smith.

Competition record

USA National Championships

Road

Track and Field

Personal best

References

External links
 
 

Living people
1988 births
American female middle-distance runners
Track and field athletes from Los Angeles
Yale Bulldogs women's track and field athletes
Athletes (track and field) at the 2016 Summer Olympics
Olympic track and field athletes of the United States
USA Outdoor Track and Field Championships winners